Gaby Coorengel (born 27 November 1969) is a Dutch former professional tennis player.

Coorengel reached a career-high singles ranking of 229 and won four ITF titles. As a doubles player, she had her best years in the early 1990s, in partnership with Amy van Buuren, reaching a best ranking of 117 in the world. The pair made the second round of both the French Open and Wimbledon in 1991.

ITF finals

Singles: 5 (4–1)

Doubles: 14 (6–8)

References

External links
 
 

1969 births
Living people
Dutch female tennis players